Atlantic Marine Construction Co., Inc. v. United States District Court for the Western District of Texas, 571 U.S. 49 (2013), was a United States Supreme Court decision dealing with the enforcement of forum selection clauses.

Background
Petitioner, a corporate citizen of Virginia, entered into a contract to build a child development center in Fort Hood, Texas. The Petitioner then entered into a subcontract with a Texas corporation for work on the project. The contract specified that any litigation resulting from the contract would be brought in state court in Norfolk, Virginia or in the United States District Court for the Eastern District of Virginia. When a dispute arose under the contract, the Texas corporation filed suit in the United States District Court for the Western District of Texas, invoking that court's diversity jurisdiction. The Petitioner moved to dismiss the suit on the grounds that venue was "wrong" under 28 U.S.C. 1406(a) and "improper" under Federal Rule of Civil Procedure 12(b)(3), citing the contract's forum selection clause. In the alternative, the Petitioner sought transfer to the Eastern District of Virginia under 28 U.S.C. 1404(a). The district court denied both motions. On appeal, the United States Court of Appeals for the Fifth Circuit refused to grant a writ of mandamus directing the district court to grant either motion.

Opinion 
In a unanimous opinion authored by Associate Justice Samuel Alito, the Supreme Court clarified that the proper procedure to enforce a forum selection clause is through a motion to transfer under 28 U.S.C. 1404(a). When such a motion is made, the district court should grant it unless extraordinary circumstances counsel against doing so. Noting that Section 1404(a) does not provide for transfer to non-federal court venues, the Court said that the doctrine of forum non conveniens still exists within the federal courts. While that doctrine has been codified at Section 1404(a) for the federal system, the same factors that apply in analyzing motions user that statute can be used to transfer cases to non-federal forums.

See also

 List of United States Supreme Court cases, volume 571
 List of United States Supreme Court cases
 Lists of United States Supreme Court cases by volume
 List of United States Supreme Court cases by the Roberts Court

References

External links

United States Supreme Court cases
United States Supreme Court cases of the Roberts Court
2013 in United States case law
United States contract case law